Lago di Loppio is a lake in Trentino, Italy.

The lake has been drained as a result of the construction of the Mori-Torbole Tunnel in 1954. It occasionally fills up again for a short time when hit by heavy rain.

The lake basin is now a wetland that constitutes a specific ecosystem hosting a peculiar flora and fauna. For that reason, the Autonomous Province of Trento declared this area as a protected biotope.

References 

Lakes of Trentino-Alto Adige/Südtirol